The 2019–20 season was Pyunik's 26th season in the Armenian Premier League.

Season events
On 24 October, Erik Vardanyan extended his contract with Pyunik.

On 30 October, manager Aleksandr Tarkhanov became Vice President of Development with Assistant manager Suren Chakhalyan being appointed acting Head Coach.

On 5 November, Pyunik announced that Erik Vardanyan would move to PFC Sochi on 1 January 2020.

On 2 December, Nirisarike signed a new contract with Pyunik.

On 12 December, goalkeeper Sevak Aslanyan extended his contract, with Levon Vardanyan signing his first professional contract on 17 December.

On 8 January, Roman Berezovsky was confirmed as the new manager of Pyunik.

On 25 January, Pyunik announced the signing of Joseph Adah.

On 12 March 2020, the Football Federation of Armenia announced that all Armenian Premier League games had been postponed until 23 March due to the COVID-19 pandemic.

On 6 May, Pyunik signed a cooperation agreement with Chinese club FC Shanghai Linkman.

On 30 June, Pyunik announced that they had extended Aras Özbiliz's contract for an additional year.

On 9 July, Pyunik announced that they had extended their contracts with Arthur Nadiryan, Norayr Ghazaryan and Serob Grigoryan.

Squad

Transfers

In

Loans in

Out

 Vardanyan's transfer was announced on the above date, becoming official on 1 January 2020.

Released

Friendlies

Competitions

Overall record

Premier League

Regular season

Results summary

Results

Table

Relegation round

Results summary

Results

Table

Armenian Cup

UEFA Europa League

Qualifying rounds

Statistics

Appearances and goals

|-
|colspan="16"|Players away on loan:
|-
|colspan="16"|Players who left Pyunik during the season:

|}

Goal scorers

Clean sheets

Disciplinary Record

References

FC Pyunik seasons
Pyunik
Pyunik